The Newcastle Stakes, registered as the Newcastle Newmarket Handicap is a Newcastle Jockey Club  Group 3  Thoroughbred open quality handicap horse race over a distance of 1,400 metres, held annually at Broadmeadow Racecourse in Newcastle, New South Wales, Australia in March. Total prize money for the race is A$200,000.

History

Distance
 1955–1972 - 7 furlongs
 1973–2015 – 1400 metres
 2016 – 1350 metres
 2017 – 1400 metres

Grade
 1955–1978 - Principal Race
 1979–1991 - Listed Race
 1992 onwards - Group 3

Venue
 Prior 2016 - Newcastle Broadmeadow Racecourse
 2016 - Rosehill Racecourse
 2017 - Newcastle Broadmeadow Racecourse

Winners

 2023 - Cross Talk
 2022 - Wandabaa
 2021 - Gem Song
 2020 - Special Reward
 2019 - Princess Posh
 2018 - Lanciato
 2017 - Happy Clapper
 †2016 - Artistry
 2015 - Laser Hawk 
 2014 - Mecir
 2013 - Bello
 2012 - He's Remarkable
 2011 - Keepin The Dream
 2010 - Walking Or Dancing
 2009 - Soho Flyer
 2008 - Falaise
 2007 - Danzippo
 2006 - Tall Timbers
 2005 - Patezza
 2004 - Platinum Scissors
 2003 - Zabarra
 2002 - Hey Pronto
 2001 - Crawl
 2000 - Spying
 1999 - Techniques
 1998 - Bezeal Bay
 1997 - Secret Savings
 1996 - Magic Road
 1995 - Pimpala Son
 1994 - Sir Bernard
 1993 - Deposition
 1992 - Blue Boss
 1991 - Ricochet Rosie  
 1990 - Comrade   
 1989 - Never Quit  
 1988 - Lucky Rass  
 1987 - race not held    
 1986 - Kui-Kong  
 1985 - Vain Fury   
 1984 - Manuan  
 1983 - Manuan  
 1982 - Grey Receiver   
 1981 - Yir Tiz   
 1980 - Painted Red   
 1979 - Stylee  
 1978 - Monakea   
 1977 - Swiftly Ann   
 1976 - Manawapoi   
 1975 - Go Mod
 1974 - Favoured  
 1973 - Gay Blade   
 1972 - Sylvan Ridge  
 1971 - Fleet Royal   
 1970 - Ricochet  
 1969 - Skellatar   
 1968 - Foresight   
 1967 - Scottish Soldier  
 1966 - Even Better   
 1965 - Brandy Lad  
 1964 - Brandy Lad  
 1963 - Zozima  
 1962 - Saydor  
 1961 - Heroic Victory  
 1960 - Dare Say  
 1959 - Amanullah   
 1958 - Achnacary   
 1957 - Compound  
 1956 - Spearby   
 1955 - Seacraft  

† Originally the race was scheduled to be run on the Beaumont Track. Due to the configuration of the racetrack the starting distance of the race was reduced. Race meeting was abandoned due to being unsafe for racing after prolonged rain and the race was rescheduled as the tenth race in the race card on Golden Slipper Stakes Day at Rosehill Racecourse.

See also
 List of Australian Group races
 Group races

References

Horse races in Australia
Newcastle, New South Wales